Girly-Sound is the name under which singer-songwriter Liz Phair recorded three self-produced cassettes in 1991. The cassettes were later made available as bootlegs, some songs saw official releases, and the tapes were released in their entirety in 2018.  Girly-Sound is also the name used to refer to the demos or bootlegs collectively.  The recordings have been called "legendary" by Spin Magazine and by AllMusic "one of the most popular and sought-after alternative rock bootlegs of all time".

Background
Recorded on a 4-track tape recorder in her childhood bedroom at her parents' house, copies of the tapes were initially given by Phair to only two people: Chris Brokaw and Tae Won Yu. However, copies of the Girly-Sound tapes were passed from person to person and became somewhat of a sensation in the American tape trading/zine subculture.  Brokaw later told Rolling Stone how he had urged Phair to record something and a few months later received one 14-song tape, getting the second 14-song tape a month after that.  In 1992, Phair signed a deal with Matador Records on the strength of a tape she had sent in consisting of 6 Girly-Sound songs.

Reworking
Phair has frequently gone back and reworked many of the songs for her studio albums throughout her career: she told Rolling Stone "I go in there and rip stuff off – it's like a library". Much of Phair's debut album Exile in Guyville contains reworkings of songs from these tapes. However, the content of some of these tracks was modified in ways that altered meanings and messages; in "Flower" the line "I'll fuck you and your girlfriend, too" was changed to "I'll fuck you and your minions, too." In addition to this, the final chorus of "Bomb" which tells of a passenger on a plane sabotaging and taking it out was entirely removed; the title of the song was changed to "Stratford-on-Guy" and a new chorus was written. Reworkings of "Ant in Alaska" and "Wild Thing" appeared on the 2008 reissue of Exile in Guyville.

Five songs were officially released in 1995 on the Juvenilia EP and a bonus disc of ten Girly-Sound songs was included with the physical release of Phair's 2010 album Funstyle.

Bootlegs
Although originally consisting of a total of three cassettes, the most common version of the Girly-Sound tapes that circulated among Phair's fans was an incomplete two-disc compilation of songs from all three tapes, released on the Bliss and Fetish bootleg label, and processed with harsh digital noise reduction. An earlier bootleg compilation of Girly-Sound material, Secretly Timid, was also circulated. Early in 2006, mp3s of first-generation copies of the first two tapes were introduced via Phair's online community, bringing to light the original track listing, correct song names, tape titles, and introducing a number of songs that did not appear on the previous Girly-Sound bootlegs. Information about the third Girly-Sound tape, Sooty, was elusive until the 2018 release of Girly-Sound to Guyville, in which it was presented in its entirety.

2018 release
In 2018, for the 25th anniversary of its original release, Matador Records released a repackaged edition of Exile in Guyville called Girly-Sound to Guyville which included remastered versions of all three Girly-Sound tapes. At the same time, the tapes themselves were separately released digitally under the title The Girly-Sound Tapes. This release omitted "Fuck or Die" and "Shatter" due to sample clearance issues.

Critical reaction
AllMusic rated the demos 4.5/5, noting some weak tracks but finding others "as tuneful and provoking as anything on her official albums".

Three tape track listing

Yo Yo Buddy Yup Yup Word to Ya Muthuh

GIRLSGIRLSGIRLS

Sooty
Track order was obtained from the 2018 Girly-Sound to Guyville release.

Re-recorded songs

 "Ant in Alaska" and "Wild Thing" were both re-recorded for Exile in Guyville, but did not appear until the 2008 reissue; "Wild Thing" only appeared on advanced promotional copies of the reissue.
 The verses in "Thrax" were reused in "Jealousy", featured on Whip-Smart. The interludes were rewritten and used for "Tell Me You Like Me", recorded during the whitechocolatespaceegg sessions.
 "Gigolo" was re-recorded as "Can't Get Out of What I'm Into" for Somebody's Miracle, though the song was only included on the Japanese release and advanced promotional copies.

Song appearances

 Fragments from "In Love With Yourself", "Johnny Sunshine", and "Money" appeared on the "Supernova" single, condensed into one track called "Combo Platter (Girlysound)".  The "Johnny Sunshine" fragment is played backwards.

References

External links
Listen to Girly-Sound; Girly-Sound official website

Liz Phair albums
1991 albums
Demo albums
Self-released albums